Night Freight is a 1955 American drama film directed by Jean Yarbrough and written by Steve Fisher. The film stars Forrest Tucker, Barbara Britton, Keith Larsen, Thomas Gomez, Michael Ross and Myrna Dell. The film was released on August 28, 1955, by Allied Artists Pictures.

Plot

Cast          
Forrest Tucker as Mike Peters
Barbara Britton as Wanda Haycock
Keith Larsen as Don Peters
Thomas Gomez as Ed Haight
Michael Ross as Louis
Myrna Dell as Sally
Lewis Martin as Richard Crane
G. Pat Collins as Kelly
Sam Flint as Gordon

References

External links
 

1955 films
American drama films
1955 drama films
Allied Artists films
Films directed by Jean Yarbrough
1950s English-language films
1950s American films
American black-and-white films